Chaudhary Gulzar Ahmed Gujjar is a Pakistani politician who was a Member of the Provincial Assembly of the Punjab, from May 2013 to May 2018.

Early life and education
He was born on 19 November 1965 in Lahore.

He graduated in 1986 from University of the Punjab.

Political career

He was elected to the Provincial Assembly of the Punjab as a candidate of Pakistan Muslim League (Nawaz) from Constituency PP-161 (Lahore-XXV) in 2013 Pakistani general election.

References

Living people
Punjab MPAs 2013–2018
1965 births
Pakistan Muslim League (N) politicians